Visitation-Makumbi High School is a private Catholic secondary day and boarding school located approximately  from Harare, Zimbabwe. The school was founded by the Dominican Order of Sisters in the early 1960s and is currently a diocesan school administered by the Society of Jesus as a part of Makumbi Mission.

History 
Founded in the early 1960s by Dominican sisters, the school began as a secondary school for girls. In 1973 a technical school was introduced at the Makumbi Mission to teach boys building and carpentry skills. In 1980, at independence, these two schools merged to form Makumbi Secondary School for boys and girls. Then in 1988, GCE Advanced Level was introduced to form the current Visitation-Makumbi High School.

The school is called Visitation-Makumbi High School and is a Jesuit-run high school, a part of their Makumbi Mission. It enrolls approximately 846 students, 600 of whom are boarders while the others are day-students from the surrounding area.

Academic performance 
In 2014, Visition-Makumbi High School was ranked number 85 out of Zimbabwe's top 100 GCE Ordinary Level schools with a pass average of 58.76%. , the same ranking applied.

See also

 Education in Zimbabwe
 List of schools in Zimbabwe
 List of Jesuit schools

References

External links
Visitation High in Zimbabwe, YouTube
Vimeo

Jesuit schools in Zimbabwe
High schools in Zimbabwe
Education in Mashonaland East Province
1960s establishments in Southern Rhodesia
Educational institutions established in the 1960s
Boarding schools in Zimbabwe